Stokesay is a historic hamlet in Shropshire, England just south of Craven Arms on the A49 road, also fleetingly visible from the Shrewsbury to Hereford Welsh Marches railway line.

Less than a mile to the north is the small town of Craven Arms and 6 miles to the south east is the larger, historical market town of Ludlow. Stokesay was once a civil parish, which covered the land now taken up by Craven Arms. However, in 1987 it merged with Halford parish to form the present Craven Arms parish. These two older entities continued as parish wards, however a review of the governance of Craven Arms in 2012 concluded in the abolition of these two wards from May 2013.

The River Onny runs past Stokesay, on its way south, and the bridge which carries the A49 over the river is Stokesay Bridge. Within the former parish, to the south of the hamlet of Stokesay is Stoke Wood and the hamlet of Aldon; to the northeast is the hamlet of Whettleton.

Nearby, on the outskirts of Craven Arms, is the Shropshire Hills Discovery Centre, with its grass roof easily seen from the A49. Also in Craven Arms is the nearest railway station, which for over a hundred years was named Craven Arms and Stokesay, before a rename in 1974.

Saxon & Norman history
In the mid 10th century, the manor of Stoke was held by Wild Edric, a Saxon nobleman, notable for his strenuous resistance to the Normans immediately after the Norman Conquest of England. The Normans wrested the manor from his hands and granted it in their normal fashion to a notable Norman as a reward for his part in the Conquest, one Picot de Say, also known as William de Picot. It was this man who had a house and church built some time after 1068.

Domesday Book
Stokesay is recorded in the Domesday Book of 1086 as Stoches. It had 47 households, making it a well-populated manor; neighbouring Aldon manor was also well-populated. Stokesay formed part of the Saxon hundred of Culvestan.

Attractions

Stokesay is famous for Stokesay Castle, a fortified manor house and one of the best preserved and oldest examples of the type in the country.

The hamlet, which even today comprises just a church, a working farm and a few houses, was previously known as simply Stoke, a widespread English placename meaning 'enclosure'.

The church is dedicated to St John the Baptist and is a rare example of the Commonwealth style (having been rebuilt during the Commonwealth of England under Oliver Cromwell's rule). John Derby Allcroft became Lord of the Manor and Patron of Saint John the Baptist church.

The film Atonement was filmed in part near Stokesay.

According to legend, Stokesay was once the home of two giants, one of whom lived on View Edge, and the other on Norton Camp. They kept their treasure in Stokesay Castle, but upon losing the key to the castle, they both died of grief.

Rail Access
 Craven Arms railway station

See also
Listed buildings in Craven Arms

References

External links

Villages in Shropshire
Former civil parishes in Shropshire
Craven Arms